The year 1622 in science and technology involved some significant events.

Mathematics
 The slide rule is invented by William Oughtred (1574–1660), an English mathematician, and later becomes the calculating tool of choice until the electronic calculator takes over in the early 1970s.

Physiology and medicine
 Gaspare Aselli discovers the lacteal vessels of the lymphatic system.
 Flemish anatomist Giulio Casserio publishes Nova anatomia in Frankfurt, containing clear copperplate engravings of the human anatomy.

Technology
 February 22 – An English patent is granted for Dud Dudley's process for smelting iron ore with coke.

Births
 January 28 – Adrien Auzout, French astronomer (died 1691)
 March 10 – Johann Rahn, Swiss mathematician (died 1676)
 April 5 – Vincenzo Viviani, Italian mathematician and scientist (died 1703)
 undated – Jean Pecquet, French anatomist (died 1674)

Deaths
 January 23 – William Baffin, English explorer and navigator (born 1584)
 February 19 – Sir Henry Savile, English polymath and benefactor (born 1549)
 April 13 – Katharina Kepler, German healer and mother of Johannes Kepler (born 1546)
 May 15 – Petrus Plancius, Flemish cartographer and cosmographer (born 1552)

References

 
17th century in science
1620s in science